The seventh edition of the CCCF Championship was held in Tegucigalpa, Honduras. Costa Rica won the tournament.

Final standings

Results

References

CCCF Championship
Cccf Championship, 1955
International association football competitions hosted by Honduras
CCCF
CCCF
1955 in Honduras
Sports competitions in Tegucigalpa
August 1955 sports events in the United States
20th century in Tegucigalpa